The 2017 Turkish Super Cup (Turkish: TFF Süper Kupa) was the 44th edition of the Turkish Super Cup since its establishment as Presidential Cup in 1966, the annual Turkish football season-opening match contested by the winners of the previous season's top league and cup competitions (or cup runner-up in case the league- and cup-winning club is the same). It was played on 6 August 2017 between the champions of 2016–17 Süper Lig, Beşiktaş, and the winners of 2016–17 Turkish Cup, Konyaspor.

Match

Details

References

 

2017
Super Cup
Sports competitions in Samsun
Turkish Super Cup
Beşiktaş J.K. matches